Larsnes is the administrative centre of the municipality of Sande in Møre og Romsdal county, Norway.

The village is home to manufacturing industry, fish processing, fish farming, and cement production.  Larsnes Chapel is located in this village.

From 1905 to 1964, the village of Larsnes was part of the short-lived municipality of Rovde.

Notable residents
Bjartmar Gjerde (1931–2009), a Norwegian politician for the Labour Party

References

Sunnmøre
Villages in Møre og Romsdal
Sande, Møre og Romsdal